A wagon master is the overseer of a group of wagons.

Wagon Master may also refer to:
Wagon Master, a 1950 film
The Wagon Master, a 1929 Western film
Wagonmaster, an album by Porter Wagoner